Dimitrios Mavrias (born 3 October 1996) is a Greek professional footballer who plays as a winger or a forward for Super League 2 club AEL.

Career
Mavrias started his career in Glyfada. On 30 January 2014, he moved to Anagennisi Karditsa where he signed a two-year contract. On April 12, 2016, Mavrias joined Superleague Greece side Veria on a free transfer signing a three-year contract as his current contract was set to expire on 30 June 2016.

Mavrias is also capped with Greece U19 where he debuted on June 12, 2015.

References

1996 births
Living people
Footballers from Karditsa
Greek footballers
Greece youth international footballers
Association football midfielders
Super League Greece players
Football League (Greece) players
Super League Greece 2 players
A.O. Glyfada players
Anagennisi Karditsa F.C. players
Athlitiki Enosi Larissa F.C. players
Veria F.C. players
Apollon Larissa F.C. players
Panachaiki F.C. players
Doxa Drama F.C. players
20th-century Greek people
21st-century Greek people